Jovan Popović may refer to:

Jovan Popović (painter) (1810–1864), Serbian portrait painter
Jovan Popović (rower) (born 1987), Serbian rower
Jovan Popović (writer) (1905–1952), Serbian writer, poet, and Yugoslav partisan
Jovan Sterija Popović (1806–1856), Serbian playwright, poet, lawyer, philosopher, and pedagogue